

This is a list of the National Register of Historic Places listings in Will County, Illinois.

This is intended to be a complete list of the properties and districts on the National Register of Historic Places in Will County, Illinois, United States. Latitude and longitude coordinates are provided for many National Register properties and districts; these locations may be seen together in a map.

There are 37 properties and districts listed on the National Register in the county, including 1 National Historic Landmark.  Another property was once listed but has been removed.

Current listings

|}

Former listing

|}

See also 
 List of National Historic Landmarks in Illinois
 National Register of Historic Places listings in Illinois

References

 
Will County